Stevens's Model Dockyard was a company which made and sold models, toys and parts for modellers (not to be confused with the original Model Dockyard or Clyde Model Dockyard - different companies dealing in similar products). Established 1843, it was located in Aldgate, London.

Products
Their products included model sailing boats and hulls, steam boats, boat fittings, stationary steam engines, machine tools, marine engines, railway locomotives, railway rolling stock, track, lineside accessories, steam engine parts, clockwork motors, hydraulic motors, boilers, electric motors, electrical novelties, telegraphs, electrical accessories, optical instruments and books. They also sold Meccano, Klipit and other branded items. Most of their products appear to have been made in the company's own workshops, but there may have been some items bought in and rebranded.

They are particularly known for the type of steam toy known as "Birmingham Dribblers". These, along with other steam engines, are now popular collector's pieces.

Company name
The name of the company implies that they may initially have supplied ship models to the Admiralty, like Clyde Model Dockyard and the original Model Dockyard.

The name used by the company appears to have changed several times over the years. "W. Stevens the Model Dockyard", "Stevens' Model Dockyard", "Steven's Model Dockyard" and "Stevens's Model Dockyard" have all been used.

References

External links
 ToySteamBible.org: Stevens Model Dockyard

Steam engines
Toy retailers of the United Kingdom
Manufacturing companies established in 1843
Toy steam engine manufacturers
1843 establishments in England